Take It Home is the twenty sixth studio album by B.B. King, released in 1979.

Track listing
"Better Not Look Down" (Will Jennings, Joe Sample) – 3:22
"Same Old Story (Same Old Song)" (Jennings, Sample) – 4:32
"Happy Birthday Blues" (Jennings, Sample) – 3:15
"I've Always Been Lonely" (Jennings, Sample) – 5:28
"Second Hand Woman" (Jennings, Sample) – 3:20
"Tonight I'm Gonna Make You a Star" (Jennings, King) – 3:26
"The Beginning of the End" (Jennings, King) – 2:21
"A Story Everybody Knows" (Stix Hooper, Jennings) – 2:47
"Take It Home" (Wilton Felder, Jennings) – 3:07

Personnel
B.B. King – guitar, vocals
Dean Parks, Paul Jackson Jr. – guitar
Wilton Felder – double bass, saxophone on "Take It Home"
Joe Sample – keyboards
Stix Hooper, James Gadson – drums, percussion
Paulinho da Costa – percussion
Larry Williams, Quitman Dennis – saxophone
Chuck Findley, Jack Richmond – trombone
Gary Grant, Steve Madaio – trumpet
Julia Tillman, Luther Waters, Maxine Williard, Oren Waters – background vocals

References

1979 albums
B.B. King albums
Albums produced by Stewart Levine
MCA Records albums